Alliance Sportive de Casablanca or Rabita de Casablanca (Arabic: الرابطة الرياضية البيضاوية), is a Moroccan handball team based in Casablanca, that plays in Moroccan Handball League.

Honours

National titles 
 Moroccan Handball League 12 :
Champions :  1985–86, 1986–87, 1987–88, 1990–91, 2001–02, 2002–03, 2003–04, 2004–05, 2006–07, 2007–08, 2008–09, 2009–10.
             
 Moroccan Handball Cup 12 :
Champions :  1983–84, 1984–85, 1986–87, 1987–88, 1998–99, 2000–01, 2002–03, 2003–04, 2004–05, 2005–06, 2007–08, 2009–10

International titles 
 African Handball Cup Winners' Cup  :

Runners-up : 
 Arab Handball Championship of Champions  :
Champions : 
Runners-up : 
 Arab Handball Championship of Winners' Cup  :
Champions :

External links
 Official website

Sport in Casablanca
Moroccan handball clubs
Handball clubs established in 1977
1977 establishments in Morocco